"Why Not Us" is a song recorded by German pop trio Monrose. It was written by Alexis Strum and Guy Chambers produced by Pete Kirtley for the band's third studio album I Am (2008). The track was released as the album's third single on 28 November 2008 throughout German-speaking Europe. Peaking only at 27 in Germany, it became the group's lowest-charting single to date.

Music video 
The music video for "Why Not Us" was directed by Markus Gerwinat and released on 14 November 2008. It shows the trio in black dresses in an autumn set, featuring visual elements from the Baroque age.

Track listings

Notes
  denotes co-producer
  denotes additional producer

Charts

References

2008 singles
Monrose songs
Songs written by Guy Chambers
2008 songs
Song recordings produced by Guy Chambers